Lok'nStore Group PLC is a provider of self storage space in the UK. The company rents individual, storage units to both business and domestic / household customers. Lok'nStore has been listed on the Alternative Investment Market (AIM) since June 2000.

History 

Lok'nStore was founded in February 1995 from one freehold store in Horsham, by Andrew Jacobs. Six years later the business became a public company.

In 2003, the company received a takeover approach valued at around £33m, which was rejected by the Board. The company received a further takeover approach in 2009, which also did not proceed.

In December 2018 the company purchased an existing storage business: 'The Box Room' in Hedge End, Southampton. The Box Room building was then rebranded as an orange Lok'nStore centre.

In February 2019, Lok'nStore Group Plc sold a document-storage business, Saracen Datastore Ltd, to Iron Mountain UK PLC for £7.6 million in order to pay down debt and help fund future acquisition and development plans.

Board of directors 

Andrew Jacobs (Executive Chairman)

Ray Davies (Group Finance Director)

Neil Newman-Shepherd (Group Managing Director)

Jeff Woyda (Senior Independent Non-Executive Director)

Simon Thomas (Non-Executive Director)

Richard Holmes (Non-Executive Director)

Charles Peal (Non-Executive Director)

References

External links
Official website: www.loknstore.co.uk
About Lok’nStore plc
Annual Report 2021

Companies based in Farnborough
Storage companies
1995 establishments in England